Bulgarian Folk Songs is a collection of folk songs and traditions from the then Ottoman Empire, especially from the region of Macedonia, but also from Shopluk and Srednogorie, published in 1861 by the Miladinov brothers. The Miladinovs' collection remains one of the greatest single works in the history of Bulgarian folklore studies and has been republished many times. The collection is considered also to have played an important role by the historiography in North Macedonia.

History

Publication 
The two brothers were interested in Bulgarian folklore. This inspired them to compile the collection. Dimitar was the first one to start collecting songs. He was advised to begin this by the Russian Victor Grigorovich in 1845. Between 1844 and 1847 Grigorovich made a tour through the Ottoman Balkans. Dimitar promised to send some folk songs later to him. He and his brother started to collect folk songs. In 1857 Konstantin took the collection prepared by them to Moscow with the hope of publishing it there, but could not find a publisher. One of the main problems was that the materials were written down in Eastern South Slavic, but with Greek letters. In Moscow he received the encouragement of the Bulgarian students there. Vasil Cholakov assisted, providing him with songs, and taking a direct part in transcribing the songs taken down by the Miladinov brothers, in preparing for publishing their collection. The 660 songs were collected mainly between 1854 and 1860. Most of them by the elder brother, Dimitar, who taught in several Macedonian towns (Ohrid, Struga, Prilep, Kukush and Bitola) and was able to put into writing 584 folk songs from the area. The songs from the Sofia district were supplied by the Sofia schoolmaster Sava Filaretov. Those from Panagyurishte area, were recorded by Marin Drinov and Nesho Bonchev. Rayko Zhinzifov, who went to Russia with the help of D. Miladinov, was another collaborator.

In 1860 Konstantin addressed Croatian Bishop Joseph Strossmayer who sympathized with the Bulgarian people, with an appeal to publish the collection. Originally, the book was written using Greek orthography. He answered Konstantin's letter positively, but insisted the folk songs should be written in the Cyrillic alphabet. Its preprint was finalized in Đakovo and it was printed in Zagreb in 1861. The collection was dedicated to Strosmayer. The book represents an anthology of 660 folk songs, but also folk legends, traditions, rituals, names, riddles, and proverbs. The collecting was highly assessed by its contemporaries - Lyuben Karavelov, Nesho Bonchev, Ivan Bogorov, Kuzman Shapkarev, Rayko Zhinzifov and others. The Russian scholar Izmail Sreznevsky pointed out in 1863 that the Bulgarians are far from lagging behind other peoples in poetic abilities. Elias Riggs, an American linguist in Constantinople, translated some  songs into English and sent them to the American Oriental Society in Princeton, New Jersey. In 1862, Riggs wrote the collection presents an interesting picture of the traditions and fancies prevailing among the mass of the Bulgarian people. The collection compiled by the Miladinov brothers also played a great role in the development of the modern Bulgarian literature.

The Miladinov Brothers Collection has been published many times in Bulgaria. The second edition came out in 1891, already in Bulgarian Principality. The third one was released in 1942, the fourth, in 1961, etc.

Macedonian controversy 
After World War II the Collection's historical context and its authors' national identity became a source of dispute and disagreement between the newly created Macedonian scientific community and its Bulgarian colleagues. Although, there was no clear separating isogloss into the Eastern South Slavic dialects then, a distinct Macedonian standard was codified in Yugoslavia in 1945. Despite some pro-Bulgarian sentiments still having persisted there, a separate Macedonian nation was also formed. In post-war Yugoslav Macedonia the collection was published for the first time in 1962 and afterwards in 1983 under the title "The Collection of the Miladinov Brothers". The reference to Macedonia as Western Bulgaria in the foreword was removed. The Brothers called Macedonia Western Bulgaria, because they disliked the first name since it was a Greek term. All references to Bulgarian and Bulgarians were replaced with Macedonian and Macedonians. However, after the fall of Communism in 1999, Dimitar Dimitrov, a Bulgarophile and minister of culture, provoked a series of public scandals that resulted finally in his dismissal. Under his auspices the collection of the Miladinov brothers, was reissued under its original title, which caused serious protests of Macedonian historians. As a result the Macedonian State Archive displayed a photocopy of the book in cooperation with the Soros Foundation and the text on the cover was simply "Folk Songs", the upper part of the page showing "Bulgarian" was cut off. Bulgarian scholars have accused their Macedonian colleagues of forging the original edition of the work of the Brothers by deliberately deleting the word “Bulgarian” from the Collection. These Bulgarian arguments have strong support in international academic circles.

Macedonian researchers claim the “Bulgarian" designation appeared in the title shortly prior to the book’s publication, and it originally was titled “Macedonian folk songs”. Researchers from North Macedonia also point to Cholakov, who specified Konstantin Miladinov's 100-forint debt. It was the exact sum Cholakov demanded for a dispatch of 100 Eastern Bulgarian songs and an authorization to Miladinovs to attach the “Bulgarian” ethnonym thereto. In fact, Miladinovs did not seek authorization and their idea was to have songs from all the Bulgarian lands, not only from Western Bulgaria, as they called Macedonia. Because of that, they aspired to these Eastern Bulgarian songs collected from Cholakov. Thus in the preface to the Collection, the Brothers expressed their greatest thanks to Cholakov, among all their associates. They have also claimed that it was published under this title because its authors were forced to use Bulgarian. However at that time, there was no standardized Bulgarian or Macedonian language with which to conform. Educated Macedonian Slavs then, called themselves Bulgarians and worked together to create a common literary standard, called Bulgarian.
Today in North Macedonia the pupils do not have the access to this collection in original, while the museums there also refuse to display it, because of the Bulgarian labels in the text. Under such circumstances generations of students there were educated in pseudo-history. In March 2021, a shipment with the original edition of the book, which was intended for the Cultural Center of Bulgaria in Skopje, was not allowed on the territory of North Macedonia, which provoked an official protest from the Bulgarian side.

Sample of the first song in the book

See also 

 Political views on the Macedonian language
 Folk Songs of the Macedonian Bulgarians

Notes

External links 
 The original collection: Бѫлгарски народни пѣсни. Собрани отъ братья Миладиновци, Димитрıя и Константина и издадени отъ Константина.
 The collection transliterated in modern Bulgarian orthography on Liternet.
  The collection transliterated in modern Macedonian orthography on Wikisource.

References 

1861 anthologies
Bulgarian books
Song books
Bulgarian folklore
 
Macedonian culture